Dead Europe is a 2012 Australian drama film directed by Tony Krawitz. It is an adaptation of the 2005 novel by Christos Tsiolkas with the same name. Peter Galvin from SBS gave the film three stars out of five, noting that the film is "dark, and emotionally claustrophobic" and is "tough to sit through". He also observes that Dead Europe "is a puzzle film, a movie where one is asked to work hard at deciphering its strangeness."

Cast
 Ewen Leslie as Isaac
 Marton Csokas as Nico
 Kodi Smit-McPhee as Josef
 Jean-François Balmer as Gerry
 Yigal Naor as Syd
 William Zappa as Vassily
 Françoise Lebrun as Leah
 Thanos Samaras as Andreas
 Danae Skiadi as Giulia
 Giannis Antetokounmpo as Neighbour's Son

Reception
Dead Europe received mixed to positive reviews, earning a 63% approval rating on Rotten Tomatoes.

Julie Rigg of ABC Online gave a positive review and called it "one of the most disturbing, and intelligent, Australian films for a long time." Tim Robey of The Daily Telegraph also gave a positive review, calling the movie a "promising drama of alienation that slides into portentousness."

Joel Walsh of Little White Lies however gave a negative review, calling it "macabre, spiteful and all too bleak in its juxtaposition of generations and their transference of guilt."

Awards and nominations

References

External links
 
 Dead Europe at Rotten Tomatoes

2012 films
2012 drama films
Australian drama films
2010s English-language films
2010s Greek-language films
Films produced by Liz Watts
Films scored by Jed Kurzel
2012 multilingual films
Australian multilingual films
Films shot in Athens